Chan Chin-wei and Chen Yi were the defending champions, both players chose to compete but participated with different partners and ended up playing each other in the second round with Chan and Han Xinyun defeating Chen and Liang Chen.
Tetiana Luzhanska and Zheng Saisai won the title, defeating Chan Chin-wei and Han Xinyun 6–4, 5–7, [10–4] in the final.

Seeds

Draw

Draw

References
 Main Draw

Ningbo Challenger - Doubles
2011 Women's Doubles